Ömer Boncuk (1917 Ankara – August 1, 1988 Istanbul), formerly Ömer Albakır, was a Turkish football midfielder and a high school teacher for music.

He started playing football in the 1937–38 season at the Istanbul team Güneş SK. He made 24 appearances in two seasons scoring two goals. Following the closure of the club in 1939, Boncuk moved to Fenerbahçe, where he played 166 games and scored 14 goals until 1947. He transferred in the 1947–48 season to İstanbulspor scoring three goals in 24 matches within three seasons.

After retiring from active sport in 1950, Ömer Boncuk pursued a teacher's profession for music at Haydarpaşa High School, where he served also as deputy school director.

He changed his surname from Albakır to Boncuk due to his nickname "Boncuk Ömer" meaning Ömer the Bead" for his short stature. In that era, many football players were nicknamed, and almost all of the Fenerbahçe footballers had nicknames.

Ömer Boncuk died on August 1, 1988 in Istanbul. He was laid to rest at the Karacaahmet Cemetery following the religious funeral service at Galip Pasha Mosque in Erenköy.

Achievements
Milli Küme Şampiyonası
with Güneş:
 1937–38
with Fenerbahçe: 
 1939–40, 1942–43, 1944–45, 1945–46, 1949–50
 1943–44, 1946–47
 1940–41

Istanbul Football League
with Güneş: 
 1937–38
with Fenerbahçe
  1943–44, 1946–47
 1939–40, 1940–41, 1942–43, 1944–45, 1945–46
 1941–42

Prime Minister's Cup
with Fenerbahçe
 1945, 1946

References

External links

1917 births
1988 deaths
Footballers from Ankara
Turkish footballers
Fenerbahçe S.K. footballers
İstanbulspor footballers
Turkish schoolteachers
Burials at Karacaahmet Cemetery
Association football midfielders